Gujarat Chamber of Commerce & Industry was founded in 1949 by pioneers of industrial Gujarat Kasturbhai Lalbhai and Amritlal Hargovinddas. With 4000 direct members which include over 200 Trade and Industry Associations and leading Chambers of Commerce of the Gujarat State. Pathik Patwari is the current president.

References

External links

 

Organisations based in Gujarat
Organisations based in Ahmedabad